This is a list of taxa whose location or distribution is notably difficult to explain; e.g., species which came to occupy a range distant from that of their closest relatives by a process or history that is not understood, or is a subject of controversy.

Specific taxa
Mammals
Falkland Islands wolf
Gansu mole
Pennant's colobus
Birds
Elephant birds
Moa
Nicobar megapode
Reptiles
Brachylophus
Lapitiguana
Phelsuma andamanense

Assemblages of taxa
Lusitanian flora

References

Biogeography
Lists of animals